Shriman Shrimati is a 1982 Indian Hindi film produced by B. Nagi Reddy and directed by Vijay Reddy. The film stars Sanjeev Kumar, Raakhee, A. K. Hangal, Amol Palekar, Deepti Naval, Rakesh Roshan, Sarika, Lalita Pawar and Anjali Naidu. Rajesh Roshan is the music director of the film. It was remake of Tayaramma Bangarayya, a 1979 film starring Sowcar Janaki and Kaikala Satyanarayana. The remake rights of this film are now owned by Glamour Eyes Films.

Cast 
 Sanjeev Kumar
 Raakhee
 A. K. Hangal
 Amol Palekar
 Deepti Naval
 Rakesh Roshan
 Sarika
 Lalita Pawar

Soundtrack

References

External links

1982 films
1980s Hindi-language films
Films scored by Rajesh Roshan
Hindi remakes of Telugu films